Edwin Fuller Uhl (August 14, 1841 – May 17, 1901) was a prominent Michigan lawyer and politician. He served as Mayor of Grand Rapids, Michigan, Ambassador to Germany and United States Assistant Secretary of State.

Biography
Uhl was born in the township of Rush, New York, the son of David M. and Catherine (De Garmo) Uhl. The family moved to a farm near Ypsilanti, Michigan, in 1844. Uhl graduated from the University of Michigan in 1862 and received an M.A. degree from the same institution in 1863. He then studied law, gaining admission to the Michigan bar in January 1864, and began practice. He would practice law alone and in partnerships for the next thirty years.

On May 1, 1865 Uhl married Alice Follett, the daughter of Benjamin Follett, a prominent citizen and onetime mayor of Ypsilanti. They had four children: Lucy Follett, David Edwin, Alice Edwina and Marshall Mortimer.

In 1870 Uhl was elected Prosecuting Attorney of Washtenaw County and served in that office for two years. In 1876 the Uhl family moved to Grand Rapids. In 1881 he became president of the Grand Rapids National Bank; he remained in that position until 1893, then returned to it in 1897. At one time he served as President of the Bar Association of Grand Rapids. In 1890 he was elected Mayor of Grand Rapids, serving two years.

In 1893 Uhl was appointed Assistant Secretary of State and moved to Washington, D.C. From May 28 to June 9, 1895, he served as Acting Secretary of State by appointment of President Cleveland. In 1895 the federal government appointed him to inspect US consular offices throughout Europe and in 1896 he was appointed Ambassador to Germany, a post he held until 1897, when the Cleveland administration and its appointees were replaced. He returned to Grand Rapids and resumed his career there until his death four years later.

He is buried in Highland Cemetery in Ypsilanti, Michigan.

External links
Biography of Edwin F. Uhl, from The History of Kent County, Michigan, Chicago: Chas. C. Chapman & Co., 1881
Biography of Edwin F. Uhl, from History of Kent County, Volume III by Arthur White, 1925

1841 births
1901 deaths
19th-century American diplomats
19th-century American politicians
Acting United States Secretaries of State
Ambassadors of the United States to Germany
Mayors of Grand Rapids, Michigan
People from Rush, New York
Politicians from Ypsilanti, Michigan
United States Assistant Secretaries of State
University of Michigan alumni
Burials at Highland Cemetery